Fast Five: Original Motion Picture Score is the soundtrack to the film of the same name, featuring the score composed by Brian Tyler. The album, with a total of 25 tracks, was released on CD by Varèse Sarabande with 77 minutes and 52 seconds' worth of music.

Track listing

References

2011 soundtrack albums
Fast & Furious albums
Varèse Sarabande soundtracks
Brian Tyler soundtracks
Action film soundtracks